1794 – French Aerostatic Corps use a tethered balloon at the Battle of Fleurus as a vantage point.
1849 – In 1849, Austrian forces besieging Venice launched some 200 incendiary balloons, each carrying a 24- to 30-pound bomb that was to be dropped from the balloon with a time fuse over the besieged city. The balloons were launched from land and from the Austrian navy ship SMS Vulcano that acted as a balloon carrier.
1861  – The Union Army Balloon Corps is established during the American Civil War.
1878 – The British Army Balloon Equipment Store is established at the Royal Arsenal, Woolwich by the Royal Engineers.
1885 – Balloons are deployed by the British Army to Bechuanaland and Suakin.
1888 – The British Army School of Ballooning is established.
1907 – The first military air organization, the Aeronautical Division of the U.S. Army Signal Corps, is formed 1 August
1907 – British Colonel John Capper flies the military airship Nulli Secundus from Farnborough to Crystal Palace in London.
1909 – Heavier-than-air military aviation is born with the US Army's purchase of Signal Corps Aeroplane No. 1.
1910 –  The first experimental take-off of a heavier-than-air craft from the deck of a US Navy vessel, the cruiser 
1910 –  First bombing attack against a surface ship: Didier Masson and Captain Joaquín Bauche Alcalde, flying for Mexican Revolutionist Venustiano Carranza, dropped dynamite bombs on Federalist gunboats at Guaymas, Mexico, on 10 May 1913.
1910 – The Aviation Militaire of the French Army is formed 22 October.
1911 – The Air Battalion of the Royal Engineers is formed, the first British heavier-than-air unit.
1911 – Heavier-than-air aircraft are used in war for the first time during the Italo-Turkish War.
1912 - The Royal Flying Corps is formed. A few months later the Dominion of Australia also formed the Australian Flying Corps. 
1914 - The Royal Naval Air Service is formed by splitting airship squadrons away from the Royal Flying Corps.
1914 – In August, Russian Staff-Captain Pyotr Nesterov becomes the first pilot to ram his plane into an enemy spotter aircraft.
1914 – 6 September, the first aircraft raid was launched by the Japanese seaplane carrier Wakamiya on Qingdao.
1914 – In October, a plane is shot down by another aircraft with a handgun over Rheims, France.
1914 – The first conventional air-to-air kill occurs on 5 October when a gunner on a French Voisin machine-guns a German Aviatik reconnaissance aircraft in World War I.
1918 - The Royal Air Force, the world's first independent air force is formed.
1918 - HMS Argus (I49) became "the world's first carrier capable of launching and landing naval aircraft".
1940 - The Battle of Britain, the first major campaign to be fought entirely by air forces, was fought.
1958 - The first ever air-to-air kill with a missile, when a Chinese Nationalist North American F-86 Sabre kills a Chinese PLAAF Mikoyan-Guryevich MiG-15 during the Second Taiwan Strait Crisis
1980 - The only confirmed air-to-air helicopter battles occur during the Iran–Iraq War.

See also
List of firsts in aviation

References

History of military aviation
Military aviation